The 2004 Idea Prokom Open was the seventh edition of the professional tennis tournament later known as the Warsaw Open. The tournament was part of the International Series of the 2004 ATP Tour and a Tier III event on the 2004 WTA Tour. It took place on outdoor clay courts in the seaside resort of Sopot, Poland from 9 August through 15 August 2004.

In the men's singles event, eighteen-year-old future world number one Rafael Nadal won his first ATP title. Future Grand Slam champion Flavia Pennetta also won her first WTA title in the women's singles event.

Finals

Men's singles

 Rafael Nadal defeated  José Acasuso, 6–3, 6–4

Men's doubles

 František Čermák /  Leoš Friedl defeated  Martín García /  Sebastián Prieto, 2–6, 6–2, 6–3

Women's singles

 Flavia Pennetta defeated  Klára Zakopalová, 7–5, 3–6, 6–3

Women's doubles

 Nuria Llagostera Vives /  Marta Marrero defeated  Klaudia Jans /  Alicja Rosolska, 6–4, 6–3

References

External links
Men's Singles draw
Men's Doubles draw

Idea Prokom Open
Orange Warsaw Open
Orange